Karayarka (also, Koroyarka) is a village in the Jalilabad Rayon of Azerbaijan.

References 

Populated places in Jalilabad District (Azerbaijan)